Gloria Gaynor is the tenth studio album by Gloria Gaynor and her only to be released on Atlantic Records after her contract with Polydor Records expired. The lead single release was a cover of The Supremes' "Stop in the Name of Love", followed by the singles "America" and "Tease Me". The album failed to garner much attention in either the U.S. or in Europe. 
It was re-released on CD by Hot Productions in 1997 with two previously unreleased re-recordings of "I Will Survive", added as track 1 (3:35) and a 5:03 Extended Mix as track 10. 
The album was reissued on 2014 by BBR Records, and did not include the re-recorded versions of "I Will Survive", although the extended version can be found on countless compilations by Gaynor over the years. Instead were included the single versions of "Stop in the Name of Love", "America" and "Tease Me", as well as the 12" disco version of "Stop in the Name of Love".

Track listings

 "Stop in the Name of Love" (Holland-Dozier-Holland) - 4:12
 "Runaround Love" (Fred Washington, Judy Wieder, Ollie E. Brown, Paul Jackson Jr.) - 4:18
 "Mack-Side" (Carlos Alomar, Linwood M. Simon) - 4:12 
 "Tease Me" (James Washington, Thomas Woods) - 5:03
 "America" (Linwood M. Simon, Norbert Sloley) - 5:28
 "For You, My Love" (Linwood M. Simon, Norbert Sloley) - 4:14
 "Love Me Real" (Kathy Wakefield, William Smith) - 5:13
 "Even a Fool Would Let Go" (Kerry Chater, Tom Snow) - 3:27

Personnel
Gloria Gaynor - vocals
James Jamerson - bass guitar
Yogi Horton - drums
Paul Jackson Jr. - guitar
Dave Tofani - saxophone
Wayne Brathwaite - bass guitar
Ollie E. Brown - drums, percussion
David Sanborn - saxophone
Kashif - OBX synthesizer
Carlos Franzetti - Fender Rhodes electric piano
Norbert Sloley - bass guitar
John Barnes - keyboards, synthesizer
Joe Beck - acoustic guitar, electric guitar
Paul Griffin - acoustic piano
John Tropea - guitar
Francisco Centeno - bass guitar
Andy Newmark - drums
Lenny Underwood - keyboards, synthesizer
Amir Bayyan - bass guitar, keyboards
Adil Bayyan - drums
Isidro "Cosa" Ross - percussion
Horns O' Plenty - horns
Dian Sorel, Ken Williams, Krystal Davis, Vic Faster - backing vocals
Cynthia Huggins, Gary Culpepper, Greg Fitz, Kelly Barretto, Meekaaeel Muhammad, Samaiyah Motley - backing vocals on "Stop in the Name of Love"

References

External links
 

1982 albums
Gloria Gaynor albums
Atlantic Records albums